The 2023 Eurocup-3 season will be the inaugural season of the planned Eurocup-3 series. It will be a multi-event motor racing championship for single-seater open wheel formula racing cars held across Europe. The championship was created as an alternative to the FIA-sanctioned Formula Regional European Championship and the Euroformula Open championship, after the latter series struggled to attract entries in late 2022.

The series aims to provide a level playing field for all drivers, with all partaking teams agreeing on a maximum budget of €400,000 per season.

Teams and drivers 
Teams will utilize the same Tatuus F.3 T-318 chassis used in the Formula Regional European Championship, but fitted with an updated body kit, a new intercooler and a battery kit. It will also be 25kg lighter than the FREC car. The car will use a 270hp Alfa Romeo-Autotecnica engine, and Hankook tires. A push-to-pass system awarding an extra 25hp will also be used.

Race calendar 
Eight destinations were announced when the series was revealed, with every round set to consist of two practice sessions, two qualifyings and two races. This calendar was finalized on 23 December 2022. As the series shares the same promoter as the F4 Spanish Championship, six of the eight rounds are held together with that series.

References 

Eurocup-3
Eurocup-3
Eurocup-3